Jeremy John Newman (born 5 June 1962) is a former English cricketer.  Newman was a right-handed batsman.  He was born at Malmesbury, Wiltshire.

Newman made his Minor Counties Championship debut for Wiltshire in 1981 against Oxfordshire.  From 1981 to 1993, he represented the county in 62 Minor Counties Championship matches, the last of which came against Devon.  Newman also represented Wiltshire in the MCCA Knockout Trophy, making his debut in that competition came against Devon in 1985.  From 1985 to 1987, he represented the county in 5 Trophy matches, the last of which came against Cambridgeshire.

Newman also represented Wiltshire in List A matches.  His debut List A match came against Northamptonshire in the 1983 NatWest Trophy.  From 1983 to 1989, he represented the county in 5 List A matches, the last of which came against Warwickshire in the 1989 NatWest Trophy.  In his 5 List A matches, he scored 102 runs at a batting average of 25.50, with a single half century high score of 62.  In the field he took 3 catches.

References

External links
Jeremy Newman at Cricinfo
Jeremy Newman at CricketArchive

1962 births
Living people
People from Wiltshire
English cricketers
Wiltshire cricketers